Capt. Edward Deforest Thalmann, USN (ret.) (April 3, 1945 – July 24, 2004) was an American hyperbaric medicine specialist who was principally responsible for developing the current United States Navy dive tables for mixed-gas diving, which are based on his eponymous Thalmann Algorithm (VVAL18). At the time of his death, Thalmann was serving as assistant medical director of the Divers Alert Network (DAN) and an assistant clinical professor in anesthesiology at Duke University's Center for Hyperbaric Medicine and Environmental Physiology.

Education 
Thalmann graduated in 1962 from Sayreville War Memorial High School in Sayreville, New Jersey. He attended the Rensselaer Polytechnic Institute, graduating in 1966 with a bachelor of science degree. He attended medical school at Georgetown University in Washington, D.C. From 1970 to 1971, Thalmann was a surgical intern at the Royal Victoria Hospital in Montreal, Quebec. It was there that he met his future wife, a nursing student.

While on active duty, from 1975 to 1977, Thalmann conducted a two-year postdoctoral fellowship under the guidance of Claes Lundgren and Hermann Rahn, at the State University of New York at Buffalo, studying the effects of immersion and breathing bag placement in rebreathers on underwater exercise.

Naval career 
Thalmann served as Chief Medical Officer on board the ballistic missile submarine  for a single deployment, from 1971 to 1972 before being posted as a research diving medical officer at the United States Navy Experimental Diving Unit (NEDU) at the Washington Navy Yard, where he was stationed until 1975.

Following his post-doctoral fellowship in Buffalo, in 1977, Thalmann returned to NEDU, now located in Panama City, Florida, as Assistant Senior Medical Officer, where he began developing new dive tables and mixed-gas diving techniques. While at NEDU, Thalmann created a number of unique and innovative underwater exercise devices, still in use today, intended to assist in gauging the underwater endurance of divers using various gas mixtures while performing physically demanding tasks.

In 1985, Thalmann, at that time the Senior Medical Officer at NEDU, was selected for the NATO Undersea Medicine Personnel Exchange Program and assigned to the Royal Navy Institute of Naval Medicine, Alverstoke, United Kingdom. There he continued development of a new decompression table and worked on improving undersea thermal protection garments. Upon the conclusion of his exchange tour in 1987, Thalmann returned to Bethesda to serve as the commander of the Naval Medical Research Institute's diving medicine and physiology research division.

Civilian career 
Following his retirement from the Navy in 1993, Thalmann stayed on at NMRI as a senior scientist in decompression research. In July 1994 took a position in Durham, North Carolina at Duke's Center for Hyperbaric Medicine and Environmental Physiology and later accepted a simultaneous position as the Assistant Medical Director of DAN in 1995.

Thalmann died on July 24, 2004 in Durham, due to congestive heart failure, at the age of 59.

Contributions to hyperbaric medicine 
Based on scientific studies of gas exchange in human tissues, further informed by his supervision of hundreds of experimental dives, Thalmann developed his namesake mathematical algorithm to protect divers from decompression sickness. The Thalmann algorithm was the basis for a new set of decompression tables that provided more flexibility for diving time, depth, gas mixtures and pressures. The algorithm was also used for developing wearable dive computers to manage complex individual dives. Thalmann's research ultimately improved decompression safety for military divers, recreational divers, and even astronauts.

Awards

Publications

Refereed journals

Non-refereed journals and reports 

Survanshi SS, Weathersby PK, Homer LD, Thalmann ED. Design of Dive Trials. In: Lang MA, Vann RD eds: . Costa Mesa, CA. American Academy of Underwater Scientists, 1992:287-292.

Book chapters 

 Thalmann, E.D., editor of Chapter 8: "Diving Medicine", in: 
 Invited Reviewer for: "Treatment of decompression sickness", Chapter 13. In:

References

External links

Ed Thalmann Papers at Duke University Medical Center Archives

1945 births
2004 deaths
People from Jersey City, New Jersey
People from Sayreville, New Jersey
Sayreville War Memorial High School alumni
Rensselaer Polytechnic Institute alumni
Georgetown University School of Medicine alumni
Duke University faculty
Recipients of the Legion of Merit
United States Navy officers
American medical researchers
Decompression researchers
Military personnel from New Jersey